mieten, kaufen, wohnen ("rent, buy, live") is a German reality series on the VOX channel which is similar to the American House Hunters show. It was produced from October 2008 to September 2016 and appears each weekday. The show is produced by Fanarseu Film TV.

References

External links
 mieten, kaufen, wohnen at Voxnow.de
 

German reality television series
2008 German television series debuts
2010s German television series
German-language television shows
VOX (German TV channel) original programming